The Partridge Family is an American musical sitcom starring Shirley Jones and featuring David Cassidy. Jones plays a widowed mother, and Cassidy plays the oldest of her five children, in a family who embarks on a music career. It ran from September 25, 1970, until August 24, 1974, on the ABC network as part of a Friday-night lineup, and had subsequent runs in syndication. The family was loosely based on the real-life musical family the Cowsills, a popular band in the late 1960s and early 1970s.

Premise

In the pilot episode, a group of musical siblings in the fictitious city of San Pueblo, California (said to be "40 miles from Napa County" in episode 24, "A Partridge By Any Other Name") convinces their widowed mother, bank teller Shirley Partridge, to help them out by singing as they record a pop song in their garage. Through the efforts of precocious 10-year-old Danny they find a manager, Reuben Kincaid, who helps make the song a Top 40 hit. After more persuading, Shirley agrees that the family can go on tour. They acquire an old school bus, a 1957 Chevrolet Series 6800 Superior, for touring, paint it with Mondrian-inspired patterns, and head to Las Vegas, Nevada, for their first live gig at Caesars Palace.

Subsequent episodes usually feature the band performing in various venues or in their garage. The shows often contrast suburban life with the adventures of a show-business family on the road. After the first season, more of the show's action takes place in the family's hometown than on tour.

Background

The Partridge Family was created for television by Bernard Slade, and the series' executive producer was Bob Claver. The show was inspired by and loosely based on the Cowsills, a family pop music group that was famous in the late 1960s. In the show's early development, the Cowsill children were considered by the producers, but because the Cowsills were not trained actors and were too old for the roles as scripted, Slade and Claver abandoned that idea. Shirley Jones had already been signed as mother Shirley Partridge and star of the show.
Insistence that Jones's casting in the role of Mrs. Partridge was not negotiable.

The pilot was filmed in December 1969. This unaired pilot differs from the pilot that was broadcast in 1970. In the unaired pilot, Shirley's name is Connie and she has a boyfriend played by Jones's real-life husband at the time, Jack Cassidy, father of David Cassidy. Laurie mentions her late father once getting drunk at a Christmas party. The family has a different address and lives in Ohio.

The show proved popular, but the fame took its toll on several, if not most, of the starring cast, particularly David Cassidy. In the midst of his rise to fame, Cassidy soon felt stifled by the show and trapped by the mass hysteria surrounding his every move. In May 1972, he appeared nude on the cover of Rolling Stone magazine in a cropped Annie Leibovitz photo. He used the article to get away from his squeaky clean image. The article mentioned that Cassidy was riding around New York in the back of a car "stoned and drunk."

Shortly after the series ended, scriptwriter Roberta Tatum launched a lawsuit against Screen Gems concerning the creation of the show. Tatum claimed that she had submitted a similar premise to Screen Gems prior to 1970 called Baker's Half-Dozen. The matter was resolved out of court, with Tatum receiving a reported $150,000 from Screen Gems.

Cast and characters
 Shirley Jones as Shirley Partridge: vocals, keyboard, tambourine, percussion
 David Cassidy as Keith Partridge: lead vocals, guitars, banjo
 Susan Dey as Laurie Partridge: vocals, harmony, piano, Hammond organ, percussion
 Danny Bonaduce as Danny Partridge: vocals, bass guitar.
 Jeremy Gelbwaks as Chris Partridge (Season 1): vocals, drums
 Brian Forster as Chris Partridge (Seasons 2–4): vocals, drums
 Suzanne Crough as Tracy Partridge: tambourine, percussion, vocals
 Dave Madden as Reuben Kincaid: band manager
 Rick Segall as Ricky Stevens (Season 4): singer
 Simone, the family's pet dog (Season 1, occasionally in later seasons)
 Gary Dubin as Punky Lazaar (recurring role): a friend of Danny Partridge

No members of the cast played any music on the show or the soundtrack albums and originally only Jones sang. Initially, all of the actors pretended to sing while listening to recordings by session musicians, who provided the real vocal and instrumental music attributed to the Partridge Family. However, after Cassidy demonstrated to series music producer Wes Farrell that he could sing, he was allowed to record his own vocal parts.

Notable guest stars
During the show's four-season run, many actors made guest appearances. Country singer Johnny Cash made an uncredited cameo appearance in the pilot episode. Ray Bolger played Shirley's father in three episodes, and Rosemary DeCamp played Shirley's mother in four episodes. Then-Governor Ronald Reagan's daughter, Maureen Reagan, was also featured in one episode. Future Charlie's Angels stars Jaclyn Smith, Farrah Fawcett and Cheryl Ladd all made guest appearances on separate episodes.

Baseball Hall of Fame catcher Johnny Bench appeared in a cameo role as a pool waiter in a third-season episode.

Bobby Sherman appeared in the last episode of the first season as struggling songwriter Bobby Conway. This episode led into a short-lived spinoff series on ABC, Getting Together, starring Sherman and Wes Stern as Conway's business partner Lionel Poindexter.

Other celebrity guest stars included:

Morey Amsterdam
John Astin
Carl Ballantine
John Banner
Edgar Buchanan
George Chakiris
Dick Clark
Jackie Coogan
Howard Cosell
Jodie Foster
Bernard Fox
Ned Glass
James Gregory
Margaret Hamilton
Pat Harrington Jr.
Arte Johnson
Harvey Lembeck
Art Metrano
Mary Ann Mobley
Harry Morgan
Slim Pickens
Richard Pryor
Barbara Rhoades
Michael Rupert
William Schallert
Nita Talbot
Larry Wilcox
Dick Wilson
William Windom

Some guest actors later became famous, including:

Meredith Baxter
Richard Bull
Bert Convy
Farrah Fawcett
Norman Fell
Anthony Geary
Louis Gossett Jr.
Harold Gould
Jackie Earle Haley
Mark Hamill
Season Hubley
Ann Jillian
Gordon Jump
Cheryl Ladd
Michael Lembeck
William Lucking
Stuart Margolin
Richard Mulligan
Michael Ontkean
Noam Pitlik
Annette O'Toole
Charlotte Rae
Rob Reiner
Jack Riley
Jaclyn Smith
Vic Tayback
Nancy Walker
Frank Welker

Episodes

Production
At the end of the first season, Jeremy Gelbwaks' family moved out of the Los Angeles area, and the part of Chris was recast with actor Brian Forster. According to David Cassidy, Gelbwaks "had a personality conflict with every person in the cast and the producers" and especially did not get along with Cassidy or Bonaduce. A dog named Simone was featured in the first season, but it was phased out during the second season. At the beginning of the fourth season, four-year-old neighbor Ricky Stevens (Ricky Segall) was featured and would sing a children's song during each episode, but the character was dropped mid-season.

Music
Music recorded for the pilot episode was produced by Monkees arranger Shorty Rogers. Songs for the ongoing series were recorded by music producer Wes Farrell. Chip Douglas was the first to be offered the job of producing the music, but declined.

The studio concoction that forms the Partridge Family sound features lead singer David Cassidy, members of the Ron Hicklin Singers as backing vocalists, and several of the era's most highly regarded studio musicians, now known as "the Wrecking Crew". Cassidy's co-star and real-life stepmother Shirley Jones also features on the recordings, although there remains speculation that she can be heard more prominently in the television mixes of the songs than in the album mixes. In each episode of the sitcom the television family of six are seen on screen together in recording sessions and concert performances, playing the part of performers, but none except Cassidy and Jones was involved in any of the actual recordings. Two tracks on the 1970 debut LP The Partridge Family Album do not feature Cassidy. These songs, "I'm on the Road" and "I Really Want to Know You", were sung in blended-harmony style by members of the Ron Hicklin Singers: brothers John and Tom Bahler, Ron Hicklin and Jackie Ward (who in 1963, as Robin Ward, charted with the no. 14 hit "Wonderful Summer"). These professional singers feature throughout the Partridge Family's output.

Cassidy was originally to lip sync to dubbed vocals with the rest of the cast but convinced Farrell that he could sing, and was allowed to join the studio ensemble as the lead singer.

Season 1, Episode 1 is the sole episode of the series that does not use any version of the theme song, instead using the Rogers and Kelly Gordon song "Together (Havin' A Ball)" under the opening credits. The first episode is also unique in that it does not include the animated main title, instead using shots of the Partridge Family singing "Together" as if in a performance.

Two different songs were used as the opening theme to the television series. Season 1 features "When We're Singin (Wes Farrell and Diane Hildebrand):

"Come on down and meet everybody,
And hear us singin'.
There's nothing better than being together,
When we're singin'.
Five of us, and Mom working all day,
We knew we could help her if our music would pay.
Danny got Reuben to sell our song, 
And it really came together when Mom sang along..." (from "When We're Singin)

The other seasons all feature "C'mon Get Happy" (Wes Farrell and Danny Janssen), which retained the "When We're Singin tune but featured new lyrics by Danny Janssen:

Hello world, hear the song that we're singing.
C'mon get happy.
A whole lot o' loving is what we'll be bringin'
We'll make you happy. 
We had a dream, we'd go travelin' together,
We spread a little love and then we keep movin' on.
Somethin' always happens whenever we're together;
We get a happy feelin' when we're singing a song..." (from "C'Mon Get Happy")

Broadcast history
For its final season, ABC moved the show from its 8:30 p.m. Friday slot (where it rated first in its slot) to Saturday at 8 p.m. (opposite CBS' top-rated All in the Family and NBC's medical drama Emergency!, against which it lost more than half of its audience from the previous season).

In the United Kingdom, the first three episodes were broadcast in a Friday children's slot of 17:20, starting on September 17, 1971. From October 2, 1971, the program moved to Saturdays at 17:10, and eight episodes were shown at this time. A further episode was shown on New Year's Eve (December 31, 1971), after which the BBC dropped the program. After David Cassidy succeeded with UK Top 30 chart hits the following year, the show was picked up by independent commercial television in many regions. On London Weekend Television, it was shown at Saturday lunchtimes. After the show's popularity began to decline in the US, it began to increase in the UK. This new popularity in the UK gave the Partridge Family five UK Top 20 Hits, some of which were less popular in the US.

After 96 episodes and eight Partridge Family albums, ABC canceled the show in 1974.

Ratings

Syndication
Nickelodeon featured a run of The Partridge Family from 1993 to 1994 as part of its Nick at Nite lineup. The network used interviews and commercials featuring cast members, and created a new version of the bus for promotion. The show also aired at various times on USA Network, Fox Family, Ion Television, and Hallmark Channel. , it airs on Antenna TV. FETV also started airing The Partridge Family in December 2017.

The cast was reunited in 1977 on the special Thanksgiving Reunion with The Partridge Family and My Three Sons. They reunited again in the 1990s on The Arsenio Hall Show and the short-lived talk show Danny! (1995) and were featured on E! True Hollywood Story, Biography and VH1's Behind the Music.

When the digital subchannel Antenna TV premiered in January 2011, The Partridge Family became one of its offerings through the network's distribution agreement with Sony Pictures Television (parent company and successor of series producer Screen Gems). From November 25–27, 2020, Antenna TV aired all 96 episodes in chronological order to commemorate the 50th anniversary of the series' debut.

Reception

Awards and nominations

Media

Discography

The Partridge Family was produced for ABC by Screen Gems. The company promoted the show by releasing a series of albums featuring the family band, though David Cassidy and Shirley Jones (as backing vocalist) were the only cast members who were actually featured on the recordings.

As the show and other associated merchandising soared, Cassidy became a teen idol. The producers signed Cassidy as a solo act as well. Cassidy began touring with his own group of musicians, performing Partridge songs, as well as hits from his own albums, to thousands of screaming teenagers in major stadiums across the US, UK, Europe, Japan and Australia.

The Partridge Family remain best known for their 1970 smash debut single "I Think I Love You", written by Tony Romeo, who had penned the big 1968 hit "Indian Lake" (and other records) by the Cowsills. "I Think I Love You" spent three weeks at number one on Billboard'''s Hot 100 in November and December of 1970. It sold more than five million copies, outselling the Beatles' "Let It Be", was awarded a gold disc, and made the group the third fictional artist to have a number one hit (after the Chipmunks and the Archies). The single's parent LP, The Partridge Family Album, reached No. 4 on the Billboard 200. It was also awarded gold status by the RIAA in December 1970, having sold more than 500,000 copies. A string of US and/or UK hit singles followed: "Doesn't Somebody Want to Be Wanted", "I'll Meet You Halfway", "I Woke Up In Love This Morning", "It's One of Those Nights (Yes Love)", "Am I Losing You", and covers of the early- to -mid-1960s hits "Looking Through the Eyes of Love", "Breaking Up Is Hard to Do" and "Walking in the Rain". These singles were showcased on the three gold-certified albums Up To Date (1971), Sound Magazine (1971) and Shopping Bag (1972), plus The Partridge Family Notebook (1972), Crossword Puzzle (1973) and Bulletin Board (1973). The holiday album A Partridge Family Christmas Card was the top-selling Christmas record of 1971. Record sales success was replicated internationally, with both the Partridge Family group and Cassidy as a solo singer achieving huge hits in Canada, Great Britain, Europe, Japan, Australia, New Zealand and South Africa. In all, the Partridge Family released 89 songs on nine albums between 1970 and 1973.

Danny Bonaduce album
Though Danny Bonaduce was not part of the session band, he also got a recording contract. His self-titled debut LP was released in 1973 by Lion Records, a subsidiary label of MGM Records. The single from the album, "Dreamland", was a minor hit. Though Bonaduce was credited as lead singer on all songs, he insists that he had a weak voice and that Bruce Roberts provided most of the vocals on the album. The first track, "I'll Be Your Magician", in which the 13-year-old Bonaduce seduces a woman into having sexual intercourse with him, has developed a cult following for its campy entertainment value. The original, watered-down version was recorded with Cassidy for the Sound Magazine album, but was discarded and never released. In fall 2010, Cassidy dared Bonaduce to learn how to play the bass guitar lines for the songs the Partridge Family performed. Bonaduce learned the bass guitar line for "Doesn't Somebody Want to Be Wanted", stating that although he had no ability to read music, the song was relatively easy to learn; Cassidy and Bonaduce subsequently performed together on rare occasions.

Ricky Segall album
In conjunction with the songs featured by Ricky Segall in the fourth season of the TV show, Bell Records released the album Ricky Segall and The Segalls in 1973.  Seven of the album's 10 tracks were featured on the TV show. Two tracks were also released as a single, "Sooner or Later"/"Say Hey Willie" (Bell 45429).

Animated spin-off
The Partridges had a brief resurgence in animated form that saw the family propelled into the future. The animated Partridges first appeared when the kids did a series of guest spots on Goober and the Ghost Chasers. That idea evolved into a CBS Saturday morning Hanna-Barbera-produced cartoon in 1974, Partridge Family 2200 A.D. (also called The Partridge Family in Outer Space when rerun later as part of Fred Flintstone and Friends). Jones and Cassidy did not voice their animated characters and Susan Dey and Dave Madden had very limited involvement with this cartoon.

Board game
Released in 1971 by Milton Bradley, The Partridge Family Game offers a glimpse of what life on the road was like for one of TV's favorite fictional pop bands. The back of the box explains, "As on TV, many happenings occur to the Partridge family, this game describes one of them. They have finished playing at a local arena and must hurry to their BUS to get traveling again. On the way, they may have some delays." The object of the game is to be the first player to get back to the tour bus.

Books
During the entire four season run of the series, Curtis Books published seventeen paperback mystery novels featuring the entire cast of characters. The various authors included Michael Avallone, Vic Crume, Lee Hays, Paul Fairman, Vance Stanton and Edward Fenton.

Comic books
Charlton Comics produced a comic book featuring the Partridge Family between March 1971 and December 1973 and later on just David Cassidy comic books. It features stories about the characters, song lyrics and features about Cassidy. The drawings were provided by Don Sherwood.

Reunion special
Three years after the show's cancellation, Jones and other cast members gathered with cast members of My Three Sons for the ABC special Thanksgiving Reunion with The Partridge Family and My Three Sons, which aired on November 25, 1977. The show featured the casts discussing the histories of their shows, although other than Jones and Fred MacMurray both portraying single parents of large families, the two series had no narrative link.

Reunion on Danny!
In 1995, a majority of the cast appeared on Bonaduce's talk show Danny!, including Shirley Jones, Dave Madden, Jeremy Gelbwaks, Brian Forster, Suzanne Crough, Ricky Segall and the show's executive producer Bob Claver. Susan Dey was working on a movie at the time but called into the show to briefly reminisce with Bonaduce. David Cassidy was also unable to appear as he was working on a new album at that time.

Come On Get Happy: The Partridge Family Story
In 1999, a "behind-the-scenes" TV movie called Come On Get Happy: The Partridge Family Story aired on ABC. The film focuses on the lives of Danny Bonaduce (who narrated) and David Cassidy.

The New Partridge Family
In 2004, VH1 produced a pilot for a syndicated The New Partridge Family, starring Suzanne Sole as Shirley, Leland Grant as Keith, Emma Stone (in her first role) as Laurie, Spencer Tuskowski as Danny, and French Stewart as Reuben Kincaid. The pilot was the only episode produced. The episode ended with a teaser for "next week's episode" in which the children's estranged father, played by Danny Bonaduce, drops in for a surprise visit with his same-sex life partner.

Home media
Sony Pictures Home Entertainment has released all four seasons of The Partridge Family on DVD in Region 1. Seasons 1 and 2 have been released in Regions 2 and 4.

On October 15, 2013, Sony released The Partridge Family – The Complete Series on DVD in Region 1.  The 12-disc set features all 96 episodes of the series as well as bonus features.

The Screen Gems closing logo was removed from episodes for the first three seasons on DVD.

On August 27, 2013, it was announced that Mill Creek Entertainment had acquired the rights to various television series from the Sony Pictures library including The Partridge Family.  They subsequently re-released the first two seasons on June 24, 2014.

On September 22, 2015, Mill Creek re-released Partridge Family – The Complete Series on DVD in Region 1 with the original Screen Gems logo reinstated at the end of the credits. No American DVD releases contain the epilogue to episode #25 (which does appear on Region 2 & 4 releases), the unaired 1969 pilot or any episodes of the spin-off series Getting Together''.

Notes

References
 "The Partridge Family Album" by Joey Green, 1994 HarperCollins Publishers
 Sonypictures.com
 Vhi.com

Further reading

External links

 
 Whatever happened to the Partridge Family?  
 Get happy! ‘The Partridge Family’ stars reunite from Today Show (March 2, 2010)

 
1970 American television series debuts
1974 American television series endings
1970s American musical comedy television series
1970s American sitcoms
American Broadcasting Company original programming
Bell Records artists
English-language television shows
Fictional musical groups
Television series based on singers and musicians
Television series by Sony Pictures Television
Television shows set in California
Television series about families
Television shows adapted into comics
Television series by Screen Gems